Robert Cosmo Nauseb (born 23 August 1974 in Otjiwarongo) is a Namibian football midfielder who last played for Ikapa Sporting in South Africa.

He was part of the Namibian 1998 African Nations Cup team, who finished bottom in group C in the first round of competition, thus failing to secure qualification for the quarter-finals.

Career statistics

International goals

References

External links

1974 births
Living people
Namibian men's footballers
Namibian football managers
Namibia international footballers
1998 African Cup of Nations players
F.C. Civics Windhoek players
Kaizer Chiefs F.C. players
Bloemfontein Celtic F.C. players
Cape Town Spurs F.C. players
Hellenic F.C. players
Santos F.C. (South Africa) players
Ikapa Sporting F.C. players
Association football midfielders
People from Otjozondjupa Region
Namibian expatriate sportspeople in South Africa
Namibian expatriate footballers
Expatriate soccer players in South Africa